Leptolalax firthi is a species of frog in the family Megophryidae from Vietnam.

References

firthi
Amphibians described in 2012
Taxobox binomials not recognized by IUCN